Alexander Leonidovich Chernogorov (born 13 July 1959) is a Russian politician. The first popularly elected Governor of Stavropol Krai (1996—2008). Honorary member of the Russian Youth Union (1998).

Chernogorov was born in Vozdvizhenskoye, Stavropol Krai. From 1982 to 1990 he was a Komsomol functionary. In 1995 Chernogorov was elected member of the State Duma.

As candidate for the Communists he defeated his predecessor Pyotr Marchenko in 1996, and was re-elected governor in 2000. He holds the military rank of captain. Chernogorov has decried Jehovah's Witnesses (calling them "Jehovists", the Soviet derogatory term for the religion) and Wahhabism as "dangerous cults" that threaten state order. Stavropol Krai is not far from Chechnya.

In late 2005, news media in Russia were reporting that Chernogorov may not continue as governor after his current term. Chernogorov resigned in May 2008, moving to the Ministry of Agriculture as deputy minister. He left this post in 2013.

References

External links 

Chernogorov's re-election process in 2005

1959 births
Living people
People from Apanasenkovsky District
Governors of Stavropol Krai
Communist Party of the Russian Federation members
Second convocation members of the State Duma (Russian Federation)